Lokovina is a settlement west of Dobrna in Slovenia. The Municipality of Dobrna is part of the traditional region of Styria. It is now included in the Savinja Statistical Region.

References

External links
Lokovina on Geopedia

Populated places in the Municipality of Dobrna